Lake Syamozero (Karelian: Seämärvi) is a large freshwater lake in the Republic of Karelia, northwestern part of Russia. It is located west of Petrozavodsk, the capital of the Republic, and has an area of 265–270 km². Maximum depth is about 24 m. There are a few islands on the lake. Syamozero is used for fishery, water transport and timber rafting. The lake is part of the basin of the Shuya River, which flows into Lake Onega.

2016 Boat Disaster
On June 18, 2016, 14 children died when a storm caught a tour group on the lake. Four people have been arrested on suspicion of safety violations as there had been repeated warnings days prior of an impending storm and advising against boating on the lake.

See also 
List of lakes of Russia

References

LSyamozero
Lakes of the Republic of Karelia